Leandson Dias da Silva (born 4 April 1981), commonly known as Rico, is a Brazilian professional footballer who plays as a striker.

Club career
Born in Recife, Rico joined São Paulo Futebol Clube in 2002, and played on the same team as Brazil international and A.C. Milan midfielder Kaká. He also played for Grêmio Foot-Ball Porto-Alegrense. Rico moved to Bahrain to play for Muharraq Club in 2005, and has spent the past five seasons there.

Last season Rico scored many important goals leading Muharraq to the Bahraini premiership. Rico scored in the last second of the match against Sitra by a penalty to secure the league for Muharraq. Rico also helped Muharraq to beat Riffa Club 2–1 in the final of the Crown Prince cup, and helped in Muharraq's run to the AFC Cup 2006 final where they narrowly lost on aggregate against Al Faisaly of Jordan.

In the 2006–07 season, Rico returned with Muharraq. At the beginning of the year he led Muharraq to the Bahraini Super Cup against Al Najma, by scoring a back heel goal to beat Bahrain international goalkeeper Abdulrahman AbdulKarim. He scored 25 goals in 21 games in the Bahraini league helping Muharraq to the championship. In 2008, he scored 19 goals in 11 games granting him the title of IFFHS World's Top Goal Scorer.

Rico transferred to Bahrain Riffa Club in May 2010, and in September 2011 he transferred to Manama.

References

External links
 

1981 births
Living people
Sportspeople from Recife
Brazilian footballers
Association football forwards
Campeonato Brasileiro Série A players
Saudi Professional League players
Bahraini Premier League players
Centro Sportivo Alagoano players
São Paulo FC players
Associação Atlética Portuguesa (Santos) players
Grêmio Foot-Ball Porto Alegrense players
Al-Muharraq SC players
Hajer FC players
Clube Náutico Capibaribe players
América Futebol Clube (RN) players
Vila Nova Futebol Clube players
Criciúma Esporte Clube players
Associação Portuguesa de Desportos players
Lagarto Futebol Clube players
Brazilian expatriate footballers
Brazilian expatriate sportspeople in Bahrain
Expatriate footballers in Bahrain
Brazilian expatriate sportspeople in Saudi Arabia
Expatriate footballers in Saudi Arabia